The 1968–69 North Carolina Tar Heels men's basketball team represented the University of North Carolina at Chapel Hill during the 1968–69 men's college basketball season.

Schedule

Rankings

References

North Carolina Tar Heels men's basketball seasons
North Carolina
NCAA Division I men's basketball tournament Final Four seasons
Tar
Tar